SET Radio is the state radio network of the Mexican state of Puebla. It broadcasts on 8 transmitters in the state with most content originating from the state capital in Puebla.

History
XHCOM received its permit in 1997. The state received the original permits for the seven other stations in 2002. The repeaters branded as their locality name and FM (for instance, Puebla FM, Tehuacán FM, Acatlán FM) until the SET was established.

Transmitters

References

Radio stations in Puebla
Mass media in Puebla (city)
Public radio in Mexico